Yukinobu is a masculine Japanese given name.

Possible writings
Yukinobu can be written using different combinations of kanji characters. Here are some examples: 

幸信, "happiness, believe"
幸伸, "happiness, extend"
幸延, "happiness, extend"
行信, "to go, believe"
行伸, "to go, extend"
行延, "to go, extend"
之信, "of, believe"
之伸, "of, extend"
之宣, "of, announce"
志信, "determination, believe"
志伸, "determination, extend"
志延, "determination, extend"
恭信, "respectful, believe"
恭伸, "respectful, extend"
雪信, "snow, believe"

The name can also be written in hiragana ゆきのぶ or katakana ユキノブ.

Notable people with the name

, Japanese manga artist
 Yukinobu Ike (池 透暢, born 1980), Japanese paralympic athlete
 Yukinobu Kiyohara (清原 雪信, 1643–1682), Kanō-school artist, and niece and apprentice to Kanō Tan'yū
 Yukinobu Nanbu (南部 行信, 1642–1702), Japanese daimyō
Yukinobu Shimabukuro (島袋 幸信, born 1942), Japanese karateka
 Yukinobu Yanagawa (柳川 雪信, birth and death unknown), Japanese ukiyo-e artist

Japanese masculine given names